Sevants All is a 1936 British short comedy film directed by Alex Bryce and starring Robb Wilton, Eve Lister and Cyril Cusack. The screenplay concerns a group of servants who switch places with the aristocrats they work for.

Cast
 Robb Wilton - Watkins
 Eve Lister - Priscilla
 Ian Colin - Gale
 Viola Compton - Lady Agatha Grant
 Arthur Young - Sir Phineas Grant
 Edie Martin - Mrs. Watkins
 Cyril Cusack - Billy
 Francesca Bahrle - Gloria
 Alan D'Egville - Mr. Horton-Pratt

References

External links

1936 films
1936 comedy films
Films directed by Alex Bryce
British black-and-white films
British comedy short films
1930s English-language films
1930s British films